The Bob Dylan Tour with Mark Knopfler 2012 was a concert tour by American singer-songwriter Bob Dylan and British singer-songwriter and guitarist Mark Knopfler. The North American tour, which was part of Dylan's Never Ending Tour 2012, started on 5 October 2012 in Winnipeg, Manitoba, and included 33 concerts in 31 cities, ending in Brooklyn, New York, on 21 November 2012.

Description
The concerts typically consisted of Knopfler and his band performing an eleven-song opening set, followed by Dylan and his band performing a fourteen-song set, with Knopfler accompanying Dylan on guitar for the first four songs.

Knopfler used the opportunity of the tour to promote the release of his album Privateering, which was released on 3 September 2012. Setlists from this tour included a number of new songs from the album, such as "Redbud Tree", "Haul Away", "Privateering", "Miss You Blues", "Corned Beef City", "Yon Two Crows", and "I Used to Could".

Knopfler's tour lineup included Mark Knopfler (guitar, vocals), Richard Bennett (guitar), Guy Fletcher (keyboards), Jim Cox (piano, organ, accordion), Michael McGoldrick (whistles, uilleann pipes), John McCusker (violin, cittern), Glenn Worf (bass), and Ian Thomas (drums).

Critical response
Knopfler and his band received positive reviews for their sets during the tour. In his review for UT San Diego, George Varga praised Knopfler for "delivering a remarkably tasteful set". Commenting on Knopfler's accompanying Dylan on "Summer Days", Varga noted:

In his review for the Los Angeles Times, Randall Roberts praised Knopfler and his band for offered a "beautiful set". Roberts noted that Knopfler's guitar tone is "an exquisite, instantly recognizable creation".

In his review for the Vancouver Sun, Francois Marchand praised Knopfler and his band for their performance.

In his review for Gig City, Wayne Arthurson was equally impressed with Knopfler and his band, noting it was probably the first time "the entire crowd were in their seats to catch an opening act." Athurson described Knopfler as "cool, collected, one of the greatest guitarists in living memory."

Tour dates

Setlists
For Dylan's setlists, see Never Ending Tour 2012.
 Setlist 1 – What It Is, Corned Beef City, Yon Two Crows, Privateering, Redbud Tree, I Used to Could, Song for Sonny Liston, Daddy's Gone to Knoxville, Hill Farmer's Blues, Haul Away, Miss You Blues, Marbletown, So Far Away
 Setlist 2 – What It Is, Cleaning My Gun, Sailing to Philadelphia, Privateering, Redbud Tree, I Used to Could, Song for Sonny Liston, Done with Bonaparte, I'm the Fool, Haul Away, Miss You Blues, Marbletown, So Far Away
 Setlist 3 – What It Is, Corned Beef City, Yon Two Crows, Privateering, Redbud Tree, I Used to Could, Haul Away, Song for Sonny Liston, Done with Bonaparte, Hill Farmer's Blues, Marbletown, So Far Away
 Setlist 4 – What It Is, Cleaning My Gun, Privateering, Yon Two Crows, I Used to Could, Song for Sonny Liston, Daddy's Gone to Knoxville, Hill Farmer's Blues, Miss You Blues, Marbletown, So Far Away
 Setlist 5 – What It Is, Corned Beef City, Privateering, Yon Two Crows, Redbud Tree, I Used to Could, Song for Sonny Liston, Done with Bonaparte, Hill Farmer's Blues, Haul Away, Marbletown, So Far Away
 Setlist 6 – What It Is, Corned Beef City, Privateering, Yon Two Crows, I Used to Could, Song for Sonny Liston, Done with Bonaparte, Hill Farmer's Blues, Haul Away, Marbletown, So Far Away
 Setlist 7 – What It Is, Corned Beef City, Privateering, Kingdom of Gold, I Used to Could, Song for Sonny Liston, Daddy's Gone to Knoxville, Hill Farmer's Blues, Haul Away, Marbletown, So Far Away
 Setlist 8 – What It Is, Corned Beef City, Privateering, Yon Two Crows, I Used to Could, Song for Sonny Liston, Done with Bonaparte, A Night in Summer Long Ago, Hill Farmer's Blues, Marbletown, So Far Away
 Setlist 9 – What It Is, Corned Beef City, Privateering, Yon Two Crows, I Used to Could, Song for Sonny Liston, Haul Away, Hill Farmer's Blues, Marbletown, So Far Away
 Setlist 10 – What It Is, Corned Beef City, Privateering, Kingdom of Gold, I Used to Could, Song for Sonny Liston, Done with Bonaparte, Hill Farmer's Blues, Haul Away, Marbletown, So Far Away
 Setlist 11 – What It Is, Corned Beef City, Privateering, Yon Two Crows, I Used to Could, Song for Sonny Liston, Done with Bonaparte, Hill Farmer's Blues, Brothers in Arms, Marbletown, So Far Away
 Setlist 12 – What It Is, Corned Beef City, Privateering, Kingdom of Gold, I Used to Could, Song for Sonny Liston, Done with Bonaparte, Hill Farmer's Blues, Brothers in Arms, Marbletown, So Far Away
 Setlist 13 – What It Is, Corned Beef City, Privateering, Kingdom of Gold, I Used to Could, Song for Sonny Liston, Done with Bonaparte, Hill Farmer's Blues, Marbletown, So Far Away

See also
 Never Ending Tour 2012

References
Notes

Citations

External links
 Mark Knopfler official website
 Guy Fletcher's North American MK/Dylan Tour Diary

2012 concert tours
Mark Knopfler concert tours